This is list of results that England have played from 1910 to 1914.

1910 
Scores and results list England's points tally first.

1911 
Scores and results list England's points tally first.

1912 
Scores and results list England's points tally first.

1913 
Scores and results list England's points tally first.

1914 
Scores and results list England's points tally first.

Year Box

Notes 

1910–14
1909–10 in English rugby union
1910–11 in English rugby union
1911–12 in English rugby union
1912–13 in English rugby union
1913–14 in English rugby union